The Port Hawkesbury Civic Centre is a multi-purpose arena located in Port Hawkesbury, Nova Scotia.

In 2007, Business Week Online named the Civic Centre as one of the top ten most impressive sports arenas in the world.

Design

The Port Hawksbury Civic Centre was designed by architect Bob Ojolick of Ojolick Associates Architects/Planners. The arena was built with being green and effort in mind, as it is one of the few ice hockey rinks in the world that allows for natural light from the outside.

Notable events

2005 - Don Johnson Memorial Cup
2005 - The National - Grand Slam of Curling
2007 - The National - Grand Slam of Curling
2009 - Florida Panthers training camp
2010 - Montreal Canadiens alumni game
2013 - The National - Grand Slam of Curling
2014 - Don Johnson Memorial Cup
2014 - The Stanfields
2014 - World U-17 Hockey Challenge
2015 - Matt Minglewood & Sam Moon
2017 - 2017 Elite 10 - Grand Slam of Curling

References

External links 
 Port Hawkesbury Civic Centre

Sports venues in Nova Scotia
Music venues in Nova Scotia
Indoor ice hockey venues in Canada
Indoor arenas in Nova Scotia
Curling in Nova Scotia